The 2018 Tipperary Senior Hurling Championship was the 128th staging of the Tipperary Senior Hurling Championship since its establishment by the Tipperary County Board in 1887. The draw for the 2018 group stage took place on 29 January 2018. The championship began on 14 April 2018 and ended on 21 October 2018.

Thurles Sarsfields were the defending champions, however, they were defeated by Nenagh Éire Óg at the semi-final stage.

On 21 October 2018, Clonoulty-Rossmore won the championship after a 0-23 to 2-13 defeat of Nenagh Éire Óg in the final at Semple Stadium. It was their third championship title overall and their first title since 1997.

Results

Group 1

Table

Group 1 results

Group 2

Table

Group 2 results

Group 3

Table

Group 3 results

Group 3 play-offs

Group 4

Table

Group 4 results

Knock-out stage

Preliminary quarter-final

Quarter-finals

Semi-finals

Final

CHampionship statistics

Top scorers

Overall

Miscellaneous

Clonoulty-Rossmore won the title for the first time since 1997. **
Nenagh Éire Óg lose the final for the fifth time since their last win.

References

Tipperary
Tipperary Senior Hurling Championship